George Airport  is an airport located in George, Western Cape, South Africa.  It was formerly known as P.W. Botha Airport, named after the state president who lived in this part of the country.

This airport was originally built in 1977 as an exact replica of the Keetmanshoop Airport in Namibia, but since its expansion and renovation, it now looks completely different. George Airport has won the award for Africa's best airport in the category under two million passengers per year six times, the last time 2017. The award is given by Airports Council International (ACI).

In 2013, the airport served 560,432 passengers, substantially more than the 154,000 in 2003. From 2014 onwards continued increase in passenger numbers were witnessed, with 2017 recording a record number of passengers of 785,486, closing in on the design capacity of the airport which should necessitate further terminal expansion in the near future.

Airlines and destinations

Passenger

Cargo

Traffic statistics

Accidents and incidents
 7 December 2009 – An Embraer ERJ 135 (registration:ZS-SJW) operated by Airlink on a scheduled flight (SA-8625) overran the runway in wet conditions and ended up on a public road. There were no fatalities, but the plane suffered substantial damage. The accident was caused by an incorrect sealant used on the runway, and the airline was cleared of all blame. Airlink's insurers took legal action against the state-owned Airports Company of South Africa.

See also
 List of airports in South Africa
 List of South African airports by passenger movements

References

External links

 
 Weather SA – George Airport webcam 

Transport in the Western Cape
Airports in South Africa
Buildings and structures in the Western Cape
Airports of the British Commonwealth Air Training Plan